Malavanitippa is a village in the West Godavari district of the Indian state of Andhra Pradesh. It is located in Kalla mandal of Narasapuram revenue division.

Government and politics 
 
Malavanitippa gram panchayat is the local self-government of the village. Malavanitippa in Kala mandal is represented by Undi assembly constituency of Andhra Pradesh Legislative Assembly.

References 

Villages in West Godavari district